The Gettysburg Battlefield Historic District is a district of contributing properties and over 1000 historic contributing structures and 315 historic buildings, located in Adams County, Pennsylvania. The district was added to the National Register of Historic Places on March 19, 1975. Most of the contributing elements of the Gettysburg Battlefield are on the protected federal property within the smaller Gettysburg National Military Park.

Historic structures include the Battle of Gettysburg monuments and memorials.  Historic buildings range from a 1776 Colonial tavern to a vacant 1962 Modernist museum (Demolished in 2013).  Contributing structures include postbellum artifacts such as the 1895 Big Round Top Observation Tower Foundation Ruin, the 1893 Electric Trolley Bed, and the only remaining Tipton Boundary Marker.

History

Historical events regarding the district's registered/documented properties include the famous 1863 Battle of Gettysburg and Gettysburg Address, and the subsequent Gettysburg Battlefield memorial development, historic commemorations, and addition of visitor services during the subsequent administrative eras.  Events preceding the battle include the prehistoric geomorphological events which formed the battlefield terrain that was an integral part of the battle, as well as the construction of structures subsequently associated with the battle.  Notable antebellum structures that no longer exist include the 1761 Samuel Gettys tavern, as well as the  McAllister Mill along Rock Creek used by the Underground Railroad.  The 1776 Dobbin House Tavern was outside of the borough when it was surveyed in 1785, and the 1786 Brafferton Inn (Hoke-Codori House) is the "oldest deeded house in downtown Gettysburg".  The  pub (Quinn's 1859 "Railroad Store",  1924 Mitchell's Restaurant) on the northeast of the center square subsequently burned and has been restored.  By 1934, the first National Park Service Parkitecture of Gettysburg granite had been completed near The Pennsylvania State Memorial.

Official groupings of historical real estate tracts began with the 1864 Gettysburg Battlefield Memorial Association era, and continued with the initial United States Department of War acquisitions in 1893.  The 1895 "Sickles Gettysburg Park Bill" (28 Stat. 651) designated the Gettysburg National Military Park (GNMP), which included areas outside of the battlefield (e.g., structures used as field hospitals) and which was transferred in 1933 to the 1916 National Park Service.  The GNMP was added to the national register in 1966, and the Gettysburg Borough Council adopted a Historic District ordinance in 1972.

The historic district, which covers a larger area than either the national park or the battlefield, was designated via 2 multiple property submissions of contributing structures and properties, the first being the Battle of Gettysburg MPS on March 19, 1975.  The list of classified structures was expanded from 618 to 1200 entries , and the second MPS was dated January 23, 2004.

The Civil War Trust (a division of the American Battlefield Trust) and its partners have acquired and preserved  within the battlefield historic district in more than 30 separate acquisitions since 1997. Some of these acres are now part of the Gettysburg National Military Park, but many continue to be owned by the Trust.

See also

References

External links

Gettysburg National Military Park Tour Roads, Historic American Engineering Record (HAER) No. PA-485

.
Gettysburg National Military Park
Historic districts in Adams County, Pennsylvania
Historic districts on the National Register of Historic Places in Pennsylvania
Historic American Buildings Survey in Pennsylvania
American Civil War on the National Register of Historic Places
Conflict sites on the National Register of Historic Places in Pennsylvania
National Register of Historic Places in Adams County, Pennsylvania
Pennsylvania in the American Civil War